The United States Senior Women's Amateur Golf Championship was launched in 1962 as an annual tournament for female amateur golfing competitors at least 50 years of age. The format began as a 54-hole stroke play competition over three days until 1997 when it was changed to a match play event. Sectional qualifying was first implemented for the 2000 championship.

The U.S. Senior Women's Amateur operates through the auspices of the United States Golf Association.

In 1977 Dorothy Germain Porter became the first U.S. Women's Amateur champion to win the Seniors' title.

Starting in 2018, the reigning champion and runner-up, and the preceding year's champion, will be eligible to participate in the U.S. Senior Women's Open.

Winners

Match play era winners

Stroke play era winners

Multiple winners
5 wins: Carolyn Cudone
4 wins: Dorothy Germain Porter, Anne Quast, Carol Semple Thompson
3 wins: Marlene Streit, Diane Lang, Ellen Port, Lara Tennant
2 wins: Loma Smith, Maureen Orcutt, Alice Dye, Constance Guthrie, Gayle Borthwick

Future Sites

References

External links
Official site

Amateur golf tournaments in the United States
Women's golf tournaments in the United States
Senior golf tournaments
Senior Women's Amateur
Recurring sporting events established in 1962
1962 establishments in Pennsylvania